The Technical University of Valencia is a Spanish university located in Valencia, with a focus on science, technology, and arts. It was founded in 1968 as the Higher Polytechnic School of Valencia and became a university in 1971, but some of its schools are more than 100 years old.

Characteristics 
The Universitat Politècnica de València consists of three campuses: (Valencia, Gandia and Alcoy) and 13 schools and faculties: School of Civil Engineering (1972), School of Architecture (1972), School of Industrial Engineering (1972), School of Agricultural Engineering and the Environment (1972), School of Building Engineering (1972), School of Design Engineering (1972), Higher Polytechnic School of Alcoi (1972), Faculty of Fine Arts (1978), School of Informatics (1982), School of Telecommunication Engineering (1989), Higher Polytechnic School of Gandia (1993), School of Engineering in Geodesy, Cartography and Surveying (1994), and Faculty of Business Administration and Management (1999).

The university offers 53 bachelor's and master's degrees and 32 doctoral programs.

Notable alumni
Joan Ribó (born 1947), mayor of Valencia since 2015.
Santiago Calatrava (born 1951), architect and structural engineer.
Alberto Fabra (born 1964), President of the Generalitat Valenciana (Valencian autonomous government) between 2011-2015.
Enrique Lores (born 1965), business executive and CEO of HP Inc.
Paula Bonet (born 1980), illustrator and painter.
Iker Marcaide (born 1982), Industrial Engineer, Founder of Flywire and Zubi Group.
Victoria Francés (born 1982), illustrator.

See also
Instituto de Biomecánica de Valencia
Instituto Universitario de Restauración del Patrimonio of the Universitat Politècnica de València
Polimedia
Xarxa Vives d'Universitats

Notes and references

External links

Escuela Técnica Superior de Ingeniería del Diseño
Escuela Técnica Superior de Ingeniería Informática
Instituto Universitario de Restauración del Patrimonio 
Spanish Universities' ranking
Electronic Design for Nuclear Applications
Doctoral School

Educational institutions established in 1971
Engineering universities and colleges in Spain
 
1971 establishments in Spain
Universities and colleges in Spain